The 2016–17 South Pacific cyclone season was the least active South Pacific cyclone season since the 2011–12 season, with only four tropical cyclones occurring within the South Pacific Ocean to the east of 160°E. Two of the four systems developed into severe tropical cyclones on the Australian tropical cyclone intensity scale. The season officially ran from November 1, 2016 until April 30, 2017. However, May featured two post-season systems: Donna and Ella, of which the former was the strongest post-season South Pacific tropical cyclone ever recorded in that month. Overall, 22 tropical disturbances were monitored by a combination of the Fiji Meteorological Service (FMS), Australian Bureau of Meteorology (BoM) and New Zealand's MetService.

Official advisories regarding tropical cyclones in this basin were issued by the FMS through the Regional Specialized Meteorological Center (RSMC) in Nadi, the BoM through the Tropical Cyclone Warning Center (TCWC) in Brisbane and MetService through the TCWC in Wellington. The United States Armed Forces through the Joint Typhoon Warning Center (JTWC) also monitored the basin and issued unofficial warnings for American interests. RSMC Nadi attached a number and an F suffix to tropical disturbances that formed in or moved into the basin while the JTWC designated significant tropical cyclones with a number and a P suffix. RSMC Nadi, TCWC Wellington and TCWC Brisbane all used the Australian Tropical Cyclone Intensity Scale and estimated sustained windspeeds over a period of ten minutes, while the JTWC estimated sustained windspeeds over a 1-minute period, which were subsequently compared to the Saffir–Simpson scale (SSHWS).



Seasonal forecasts

Ahead of the cyclone season, the Fiji Meteorological Service (FMS), Australian Bureau of Meteorology (BoM), New Zealand's MetService and National Institute of Water and Atmospheric Research (NIWA) and various other Pacific Meteorological services, all contributed towards the Island Climate Update tropical cyclone outlook that was released during October 2016. The outlook took into account the ENSO neutral conditions that had been observed across the Pacific and analogue seasons that had ENSO neutral and weak La Niña conditions occurring during the season. The outlook called for a near average number of tropical cyclones for the 2016–17 season, with eight to ten named tropical cyclones, to occur between 135°E and 120°W compared to an average of 10.4. At least five of the tropical cyclones were expected to become Category 3 severe tropical cyclones, while four could become Category 4 severe tropical cyclones; they also noted that a Category 5 severe tropical cyclone was unlikely to occur. In addition to contributing towards the Island Climate Update outlook, the FMS and the BoM issued their own seasonal forecasts for the South Pacific region.

The BoM issued two seasonal forecasts for the Southern Pacific Ocean, for their self-defined eastern and western regions of the South Pacific Ocean. They predicted that the Western region between 142.5°E and 165°E, had a 65% chance of seeing activity above its average of 7 tropical cyclones. The BoM also predicted that the Eastern Region between 165°E and 120°W, had a 52% chance of seeing activity above its average of 10 tropical cyclones. Within their outlook the FMS predicted that between five and six tropical cyclones, would occur within the basin compared to an average of around 7.3 cyclones. At least three of the tropical cyclones were expected to become Category 3 severe tropical cyclones, while one or two were predicted to peak as a Category 4 or 5 severe tropical cyclone. They also reported that the tropical cyclone genesis trough was expected to be located, within the Coral Sea to the west of the International Date Line. This was based on the expected and predicted ENSO conditions, and the existence of the Pacific warm pool of sub-surface temperature anomalies in this region.

Both the Island Climate Update and the FMS tropical cyclone outlooks assessed the risk of a tropical cyclone affecting a certain island or territory. As the tropical cyclone genesis trough of low pressure was expected to be located to the west of the International Date Line, normal or slightly above normal activity was expected for areas near the dateline. The Island Climate Update Outlook predicted that Fiji, New Zealand, Samoa, Tokelau, Tuvalu, Vanuatu, Wallis and Futuna, the Solomon and Cook Islands had a normal risk of being impacted by a tropical cyclone or ex tropical cyclone. They also predicted that Tonga, Papua New Guinea and Niue had an elevated chance of being impacted, while it was thought unlikely that French Polynesia, Kiribati and the Pitcairn Islands would be affected by a tropical cyclone. The FMS's outlook predicted that Fiji and Tonga had an elevated risk, while Tuvalu, French Polynesia and Kiribati, were thought to have a low to reduced chance of being affected by a tropical cyclone. The outlook also predicted that New Caledonia, Niue, Samoa, Solomon Islands, Tokelau, Vanuatu, Wallis & Futuna were thought to have a normal chance of being affected by a tropical cyclone. It was thought that there was an elevated risk of the Solomon Islands being impacted by at least one severe tropical cyclone, while other areas such as Fiji, New Caledonia, Niue, Samoa, French Polynesia and Tuvalu, had a normal to reduced chance of being impacted by a severe tropical cyclone.

An updated tropical cyclone outlook was issued by the Island Climate Update during February 2017, as the predicted La Niña conditions had not materialised and the season had produced no tropical cyclones. The outlook reported that around six tropical cyclones were now expected to occur, within the South Pacific between February and the end of the season in April. As a result, the season overall was now expected to below average, however, many islands were still expected to have a near normal risk of a tropical cyclone impacting them.

Seasonal summary

After a near average but destructive tropical cyclone season during the previous year, the first tropical disturbance of the season developed to the north-northeast of Niue during November 12. However, over the next few months, no named tropical cyclones developed. This was attributed to a number of factors, including a poorly organised South Pacific convergence zone and a predicted La Niña episode not developing. Four months after the beginning of the season, the first named storm, Bart, developed on February 21, making it one of the latest forming named tropical cyclones within the basin. No more cyclones were named for nearly two months after this, until the system that became Severe Tropical Cyclone Cook formed. The most active period of the season in terms of cyclone formation actually occurred outside the official bounds of the season, with both Severe Tropical Cyclone Donna and Tropical Cyclone Ella being named in May.

Systems

Tropical Depression 04F

Tropical Depression 05F

Tropical Depression 09F

During that day the system moved south-eastwards away from Fiji, before it moved back towards the island nation and passed over the southern Fijian islands between February 6–9.

Tropical Depression 10F

Tropical Depression 11F

Tropical Depression 13F

Tropical Depression 14F

 The initially disorganized system intensified until it reached its initial peak intensity of 45 knots while accelerating north.  On February 20, the system began to organize again, and the JTWC upgraded the system to Tropical Cyclone 08P as it neared landfall on Fiji before crossing the International Date Line. The cyclone later reached its secondary peak intensity of 40 knots before it underwent extratropical transition, a process that completed during the early hours of February 23.

Tropical Cyclone Bart

Over the next couple of days, the system gradually developed further and became a tropical depression, as it moved south-eastwards within an area of low vertical wind shear. During February 21, the JTWC initiated advisories and designated it as Tropical Cyclone 07P, after an ASCAT satellite image had revealed the presence of  winds, within its partially exposed circulation. After it had been named, Bart continued to move south-eastwards and passed to the west of the Southern Cook Islands, before it entered MetService's area of responsibility early on February 22. During that day, the system gradually transitioned and was reclassified as an extratropical cyclone, before it continued to weaken and dissipated over open seas. Gale-force winds, rain and thunderstorms were observed over the Southern Cook Islands, but there was no significant impact reported.

Tropical Depression 19F 

The system was poorly organised at this stage and lied within an upper-level monsoonal trough of low pressure in a moderate area of vertical wind shear. It existed for a very long period of time as it moved slowly, and ties Typhoon Noru for the longest lasting storm in 2017

Severe Tropical Cyclone Cook

Over the next couple of days, the disturbance moved south-westwards and gradually developed further, before it was classified as a tropical depression by the FMS during April 7. The system subsequently continued to move south-westwards and passed near to or over the islands of Maewo, Ambae and Malakula in northern Vanuatu. As the system impacted Vanuatu, the JTWC and the FMS reported that the system had developed into a tropical cyclone, with the latter naming it as Cook. After Cook was named, the cyclone steadily intensified further and developed a  eye, as it moved south-westwards towards New Caledonia. Cook subsequently passed over New Caledonia during April 10, before it started to move southwards towards New Zealand and transition into an extratropical cyclone as it moved southwards towards New Zealand. The system was subsequently declared extratropical by both MetService and the JTWC during April 11, before it made landfall on New Zealand's North Island during April 13. After making landfall, the system moved south-southwest and moved to the east of the South Island during the following day before they were last noted during April 17.

Severe Tropical Cyclone Donna

Cyclone Donna was the strongest off-season South Pacific tropical cyclone on record during the month of May.

Tropical Cyclone Ella

Amid generally favorable environmental conditions, Tropical Depression 22F developed southwest of American Samoa on 9 May. Just three hours later, the system intensified into a Category 1 tropical cyclone on the Australian scale, and was named Ella by the Fiji Meteorological Service (FMS).

Other systems
As a result, 01F was subsequently last noted during November 13, as it was not expected to develop into a tropical cyclone. Over the next few days, the system remained poorly organised as it slowly moved south-eastwards, before the FMS reported that 02F was not expected to develop into a tropical cyclone and issued its last advisory on the system. Over the next couple of days, 03F moved eastwards towards Vanuatu and remained poorly organised, before the FMS issued its last advisory on the system during November 30.

Over the next couple of days, the system and associated trough of low pressure, moved south-eastwards towards Tonga, before the disturbance was last noted during March 21. Cloud bands associated with the trough brought heavy rain and flooding to the Northern Division.

Season effects
This table lists all the storms that developed in the South Pacific to the east of longitude 160°E during the 2016–17 season. It includes their intensity on the Australian tropical cyclone intensity scale, duration, name, where they affected, deaths and damages (in 2016 USD).

|-
|  ||  || bgcolor=#| || bgcolor=#| || bgcolor=#| || None || None || None ||
|-
|  ||  || bgcolor=#| || bgcolor=#| || bgcolor=#| || None || None || None ||
|-
|  ||  || bgcolor=#| || bgcolor=#| || bgcolor=#| || None || None || None ||
|-
|  ||  || bgcolor=#| || bgcolor=#| || bgcolor=#| || Fiji ||  || None ||
|-
|  ||  || bgcolor=#| || bgcolor=#| || bgcolor=#| || None || None || None ||
|-
|  ||  || bgcolor=#| || bgcolor=#| || bgcolor=#| || None || None || None ||
|-
|  ||  || bgcolor=#| || bgcolor=#| || bgcolor=#| || None || None || None ||
|-
|  ||  || bgcolor=#| || bgcolor=#| || bgcolor=#| || None || None || None ||
|-
|  ||  || bgcolor=#| || bgcolor=#| || bgcolor=#| || Fiji || None || None ||
|-
|  ||  || bgcolor=#| || bgcolor=#| || bgcolor=#| || Vanuatu, Fiji || None || None ||
|-
|  ||  || bgcolor=#| || bgcolor=#| || bgcolor=#| || Vanuatu, Fiji || None || None ||
|-
|  ||  || bgcolor=#| || bgcolor=#| || bgcolor=#| || Fiji || None || None ||
|-
|  ||  || bgcolor=#| || bgcolor=#| || bgcolor=#| || None || None || None ||
|-
|  ||  || bgcolor=#| || bgcolor=#| || bgcolor=#| || Fiji || None || None ||
|-
|  ||  || bgcolor=#| || bgcolor=#| || bgcolor=#| || Southern Cook Islands || None || None ||
|-
|  ||  || bgcolor=#| || bgcolor=#| || bgcolor=#| || None || None || None ||
|-
|  ||  || bgcolor=#| || bgcolor=#| || bgcolor=#| || None || None || None ||
|-
|  ||  || bgcolor=#| || bgcolor=#| || bgcolor=#| || None || None || None ||
|-
|  ||  || bgcolor=#| || bgcolor=#| || bgcolor=#| || Samoa, Niue || None || None ||
|-
|  ||  || bgcolor=#| || bgcolor=#| || bgcolor=#| || Vanuatu, New Caledonia, New Zealand ||  ||  ||
|-
|  ||  || bgcolor=#| || bgcolor=#| || bgcolor=#| || Solomon Islands, Vanuatu, FijiNew Caledonia, New Zealand ||  || 2 ||
|-
|  ||  || bgcolor=#| || bgcolor=#| || bgcolor=#| || Samoan Islands, Tonga, Wallis and Futuna || None || None ||
|-

See also

 Weather of 2016 and 2017
Tropical cyclones in 2016 and 2017
List of South Pacific cyclone seasons
List of off-season South Pacific tropical cyclones
Atlantic hurricane seasons: 2016, 2017
Pacific hurricane seasons: 2016, 2017
Pacific typhoon seasons: 2016, 2017
North Indian Ocean cyclone seasons: 2016, 2017
2016–17 Australian region cyclone season
2016–17 South-West Indian Ocean cyclone season
South Atlantic tropical cyclone

References

External links

 
South Pacific cyclone seasons
2016 SPac
2017 SPac